The Justices Protection Act 1848 (11 & 12 Vict. c.44) was an Act of the Parliament of the United Kingdom that gave Justices of the Peace in England and Wales immunity from civil actions arising from their adjudication.

The Act was sponsored and drafted by John Jervis and was one of the so-called Jervis Acts of 1848.

Background
Prior to the Act, Justices of the Peace (magistrates) were hampered in their functions by the risk of prosecution or civil action for decisions they had taken in the execution of their official functions. An individual disgruntled at a decision could mount a de facto challenge by bringing a civil claim against a Justice and even achieve a rehearing of his case. Claims against Justices for damages, through writs of certiorari, for exceeding their jurisdiction were particularly common. The courts did, however, take any opportunity to interpret the law narrowly so as to exclude the challenges, as for example in the Bumboat case,
 and Sheridan has doubted whether there was really an extensive problem.

Sir John Jervis was Attorney General and shared the widespread view that the law as to Justices was archaic and in need in reform. Further, Justices were becoming increasingly important with the rise of criminal legislation. The Act was one of the three Jervis Acts, the other two being the Summary Jurisdiction Act 1848 and Indictable Offences Act 1848.

The Act
The long title of the Act was:

The Act, for the first time in England and Wales, drew a distinction between unlawful acts of Justices within their jurisdiction and acts unlawful because performed outside the Justice's jurisdiction. Claims could only be brought for actions within jurisdiction if there was an allegation that the action was malicious and without reasonable and probable cause.

Repeal
The Act was repealed by the Justices of the Peace Act 1979 which introduced similar protection. The law is now contained in sections 31-33 of the Courts Act 2003.

Related legislation
The Constables Protection Act 1750 already gave constables "and other officers" protection from being sued for carrying out the orders of the courts.

References

Bibliography

Getzler, J. S. (2004) "Jervis, Sir John (1802–1856)", Oxford Dictionary of National Biography, Oxford University Press, accessed 4 July 2007 

1848 in British law
United Kingdom Acts of Parliament 1848
Acts of the Parliament of the United Kingdom concerning England and Wales
Legal history of England
Repealed United Kingdom Acts of Parliament